Problems, Problems, Problems is a series of educational mathematics textbooks ranging from grade 7-12. The math questions are from previous math contests held by the Centre for Education in Mathematics and Computing at the University of Waterloo. The series is a resource to complement the Canadian high school curriculum and for self-development, although it is also used to study for the CEMC Math Contests. Each combined grade level has several book volumes. Each book contains around 300 questions, and is categorized into various sections. Each question has a reference number in the form "year-contest-question number".

The Problems, Problems, Problems series collection is a National Library of Canada Cataloging in Publication (CIP).

References 

Series of mathematics books